Environmental volunteers conduct a range of activities including environmental monitoring (e.g. wildlife); ecological restoration such as revegetation and weed removal, and educating others about the natural environment. They also participate in community based projects, improving footpaths, open spaces, and local amenities for the benefit of the local community and visitors. The uptake of environmental volunteering stems in part from the benefits for the volunteers themselves, such as improving social networks and developing a sense of place.

Type of Environmental Volunteering

Environmental volunteering can take many forms:

1) Practical: Perhaps most well known are practical forms of environmental volunteering. Volunteers may be involved in practical habitat management, vegetation cutting, removal of invasive species etc.

2) Fundraising: Many environmental organisations are charitable in nature and thus rely on donations for financial support. Volunteers may be involved in the raising of funds on the grounds.

3) Administrative: volunteers with professional skills, such as legal or PR knowledge, may volunteer in a support role using these skills to provide administrative support.

Motivation

Like other types of volunteering, environmental volunteers are motivated by a range of different factors, some of which are altruistic and others are for personal interest and development. The principal motivation behind participating in environmental volunteering in to improve the environment. Surveys have found that those engaged in environmental volunteering care deeply about the environment and wish to improve the environment in which they live within. Recognised motivations are:

1) making a contribution to community: As illustrated by the 'Big Society' concept promoted by David Cameron.

2) promoting social interaction,

3) personal development, Volunteering is also seen as helping employment prospects. Employers frequently cite volunteering as enhancing job applications. A variety of studies have found that the personal health of those engaged in volunteer work improves. In particular volunteering improves personal mental well-being. Environmental volunteering enhances community cohesion and improves society. This was notably recognised in the UK and the promotion of the 'Big Society' concept of the David Cameron government.

4) learning about the natural environment: volunteering is seen as a method to promote knowledge about the environment.

5) a general ethic of care for the environment.

6) Health: Environmental volunteering has also been associated with helping those with mental health conditions, as physical activity and fresh air benefits some sufferers. Volunteering has many physical and mental health benefits, and it can help tackle loneliness. For example a survey of over 2000 volunteers found that over 90% had had a positive experience due to volunteering

The advantages to the environmental sector from volunteering are obviously financial. Much of the work required can not be funded and would not be performed if needed to be paid. Another important benefit that the environmental sector gains from volunteering is that it enhances community engagement in conservation; those having participated in volunteering remain commuted conservationists.

Citizen Science
Volunteers have been increasingly conducting roles such as environmental monitoring, known as 'Citizen Science'. Public investment in professional environmental managers to conduct those roles has tended to decline. Citizen Science allows large numbers of people to participate in environmental activities.

An example of environmental volunteering is the project Let's Do It! World, asking worldwide people to join a series of local, national and regional clean-up events. A project called World Cleanup 2012 started on 24 March 2012, with people from more than 80 countries participating. Perhaps the largest success in organising environmental volunteers was achieved in Slovenia by the group Ecologists Without Borders, which managed to activate over 10% of the total Slovenian population in several cleaning campaigns. Environmental projects operate all over the world at all scales, with new projects being launched almost daily, such as the Western Isles Support for the Environmental Project in the Outer Hebrides of Scotland, UK. To support many different smaller projects and educational tasks the Voluntary ecological year was founded in the 1990s in Austria and Germany.

Internships
Internships are typically longer term voluntary placements, aimed at graduates wishing to gain the experience required to work in the environmental sector. Internships last typically for six months but can last as long as a year. Interns often work on a specific project, working in a full time manner. Internships are often formalised with contracts and specific job roles.

Internships are seen as method for graduates to gain the required work experience to work in the environmental sector. However, there has been increasing concern about unpaid internships generally. The Taylor Report into working practises advocated the banning of unpaid internships as they were seen as a barrier to those entering professions from low socio-economic backgrounds.

Specific concerns relating to Internships in the Environmental sector are more based reducing the number of level entry posts, exploitation for menial tasks. The concept of 'voluntary credentialism' with extended periods of volunteer work being seen as required for paid roles, whether of relevance to the post or not, is being seen.

See also

 Volunteering
 Virtual volunteering
 Voluntarism (action)

References